ELA-1, short for Ensemble de Lancement Ariane 1 (French for Ariane Launch Area 1), now named Ensemble de Lancement Vega (short ELV), is a launch pad at the Centre Spatial Guyanais in French Guiana. It has been used to support launches of the Europa rocket, Ariane 1, Ariane 3, and is currently used to launch Vega rockets.

History

Europa (BEC) 
ELA-1, at the time designated Base Équatoriale du CECLES (BEC) was constructed as an equatorial launch site for the Europa-II rocket which was being built as part of the ELDO programme. The first launch occurred on 5 November 1971. This was the only flight of the Europa-II, which ended in failure due to a guidance problem. The launch site was mothballed, and later demolished.

Ariane (ELA) 
When the Ariane 1 programme was started, to replace the failed ELDO programme, a new launch site was built on the site of the former CECLES pad. This was designated Ensemble de Lancement Ariane (ELA). The first Ariane 1 launch occurred on 24 December 1979. ELA was also used by Ariane 2 and Ariane 3 rockets, which first flew on 31 May 1986 and 4 August 1984 respectively. ELA was redesignated ELA-1 when the Ariane 4 entered service in 1988, as this launched from a separate launch pad, designated ELA-2. The Ariane 1 was retired on 22 February 1986, the Ariane 2 on 2 April 1989, and the Ariane 3 on 12 July 1989. ELA was subsequently demolished.

Vega (ELV) 
In November 2001, started the redevelopment of the pad to accommodate the Vega rocket and the ELA-1 was redesignated Ensemble de Lancement Vega (ELV). The reconstruction retained the Ariane 1 flame trench and added a new 50 m tall retractable vertical assembly building to cover the rocket during the preparation, four lighting protection masts and a new launch tower for the rocket. The launchpad is sometimes also designated as Site de Lancement Vega (SLV) and Zone de Lancement Vega (ZLV). Vega made its first launch from the complex on 13 February 2012.

Launch History 

Situation on 21 December 2022

See also 

 Ariane 1
 Ariane 2
 Ariane 3
 Ariane (rocket family)
 Europa
 Vega
 ELA-2
 Centre Spatial Guyanais

References

External links 
 Encyclopedia Astronautica - Kourou

Guiana Space Centre